The 2015–16 season was Fenerbahçe 102nd season in the existence of the club. The team played in the TBL and in the Euroleague.

Season overview

Players

Squad information

Players In

|}

Total spending:  €1 M

Players Out

Total income:  €0

Total expenditure:  €1 M

Technical Staff

General Manager  Maurizio Gherardini
Assistant General Manager  Ömer Onan
Team Manager  Cenk Renda
Head coach  Željko Obradović
Assistant coach  Josep Maria Izquierdo
Assistant coach  Vladimir Androić
Assistant coach  Erdem Can
Conditioning coach  Predrag Zimonjić
Conditioning coach  İlker Belgutay
Physiotherapist  Sefa Öztürk

Kit

Supplier: Nike
Main sponsor: Ülker

Back sponsor: Odeabank
Short sponsor:

Statistics

Pre-season and friendlies
Euroleague US Tour

Competitions

Overall

Overview

Turkish Basketball Super League

League table

Playoffs

Finals

Finals MVP
 Luigi Datome (Fenerbahçe)

Turkish Basketball Cup

Final

Final MVP
 Bogdanović (Fenerbahçe)

Euroleague

Regular season

Top 16

Playoffs

In the playoffs, teams play against each other which must win three games to win the series. Thus, if one team win three games before all five games have been played, the games that remain are omitted. The team that finished in the higher Top 16 place will be played the first, the second and the fifth (if it is necessary) game of the series at home.

Game 1 was played on 12 April, while Game 2 was played on 14 April. Game 3 was played on 19 April 2016. This playoff series was a rematch of last season's Final Four match-up, where Fenerbahçe would officially be knocked out of championship contention that season.

Final Four

Semifinal

Final

Individual awards
Euroleague MVP of the Month
 Jan Veselý, January
 Ekpe Udoh, April

Euroleague Weekly MVPs
 Jan Veselý – Top 16, Week 4
 Luigi Datome – Top 16, Week 9
 Ekpe Udoh – Playoffs, Game 2
 Ekpe Udoh – Playoffs, Game 3

References

External links

2015-16
2015–16 in Turkish basketball by club
2015–16 Euroleague by club